Dmitry Sibilev (born 23 July 2000) is a Belarusian professional footballer who plays for Isloch Minsk Raion.

References

External links 
 
 

2000 births
Living people
Sportspeople from Brest, Belarus
Belarusian footballers
Association football midfielders
FC Dynamo Brest players
FC Rukh Brest players
FC Krumkachy Minsk players
FC Smorgon players
FC Naftan Novopolotsk players
FC Isloch Minsk Raion players